The Sultan Iskandar Mosque is a mosque located at Bandar Dato' Onn, Johor Bahru District, Johor, Malaysia. The mosque was named after the late 24th and fourth Sultan of Johor, Almarhum Sultan Iskandar ibni Almarhum Sultan Ismail.

History
The mosque was built by Johor Land Berhad, and currently being managed by Waqaf An-Nur Corporation Berhad, both are subsidiaries of Johor Corporation (JCorp). It was initially known as Bandar Dato' Onn Mosque. Construction began from 2012 and was completed in 2015. The mosque was officially opened on 8 April 2016 by the Tunku Mahkota of Johor, Tunku Ismail Idris ibni Sultan Ibrahim in conjunction of his late grandfather Sultan Iskandar's birthday.

Architecture
Ottoman style mosque.

See also

 Islam in Malaysia

References

External links
 

2015 establishments in Malaysia
Buildings and structures in Johor Bahru
Mosques in Johor
Mosques completed in 2015
Mosque buildings with domes